Yarrow: An Autumn Tale is an urban fantasy novel by Charles de Lint, set in 1980s Ottawa. The plot concerns a fantasy writer who has a secret source of inspiration: when she dreams, she visits a world where magic is real. Unknown to her, a supernatural predator who feeds on dreams is feeding on her and destroying that world.

External links
 Author's web site (contains excerpts from book reviews) 
 Internet Speculative Fiction Fanbase (list of reviews)

1989 Canadian novels
1989 fantasy novels
Ace Books books
Novels by Charles de Lint
Novels set in Ottawa